This is a list of works important to the study of North Korea.

General reference

Bibliographies

Geography

Government and politics

Foreign relations

Military

History

Korean War

Culture

Economy and infrastructure

Education

See also
 Outline of North Korea
 Wikipedia:List of bibliographies
 North Korean studies
 Kim Il-sung bibliography
 Kim Jong-il bibliography
 Kim Jong-un bibliography

Books about North Korea
North Korea